Iqra National University (INU) (Iqrā (iq-raa) Arabic-إقرا; translation: "Read") (جامعہ اقراء) is a private university in Peshawar, KPK, Pakistan.

It is chartered by the Government of Khyber Pakhtunkhwa and is recognized by HEC (Higher Education Commission) and Pakistan Engineering Council. It offers a range of undergraduate and postgraduate programs as well as PhD programs in Management Sciences, Computer Sciences, Engineering, Education, Media Sciences, and Fashion Designing.

History 
It was the Peshawar Campus of Iqra University (until 2010).

The university started its independent academic setup under the provisional charter granted by Ordinance “Iqra National University Ordinance 2010” vide “Khyber Pakhtunkhwa Ordinance No. VII of 2010” on November 25, 2010, that is published in the Government Gazette as an “Act of the Provincial Legislature of the Khyber Pakhtunkhwa” on April 23, 2011.

Although, it is a newly chartered university, the name “Iqra” is not new in education since the management, the faculty and the infrastructure has served the nation at Peshawar for the last one decade, when it emerged as a campus of Iqra University Karachi chartered by the Government of Sindh in 2000 at University Town in a rented premises.

Location 
The Iqra National University has its spacious campus at the heart of phase-II, Hayatabad Peshawar. The university is adjacent to Bagh-e-Naran, a recreational park popular since the establishment of the Hayatabad Township, and Hayatabad Sports Complex.

Admission 
Admissions to all programs and constituent / affiliated units are granted on the basis of merit as determined through the INU Admission Test or ETEA / SAT / GMAT / GRE / GAT scores and the students' records.

Schools

School of Civil Engineering

School of Electrical Engineering

School of Computer Science

School of Business Administration

School of Art & Design

School of Allied Health Sciences

Labs and Facilities

Student Information Center (SIC) 

The university has designed an official mascot named ‘Otaku’ which acts like a guide for students. Through pictorial descriptions, Otaku helps explain university guidelines, events, updates and information related to the SIC (student information center). I-WIZ, an intelligent system (automated teller machine), designed to cater to the needs of currently enrolled students. Installed at university's lobby, it has made academic information readily accessible and only a click away. It provides easy access to the time table, results, incomplete transcript, examination slip and fee bills.

Computer Resource Center 

The computer network at Iqra University comprises more than 50 nodes providing multiple computing environments running latest software on contemporary servers. Available research facilities are Artificial Intelligence, Robotics, and digital signal processing.

Internet 

Students of INU are facilitated with Internet services in its online lab. The online lab is equipped with all modern facilities like broadband Internet service, highly configured PC with networking system. Besides, the whole campus is under a local area network to facilitate intra communications.

Classrooms 

Iqra has been providing students with well-furnished and air-conditioned classrooms. All classrooms are specious enough for students to take part in the classes comfortably and smoothly.

Laboratories 

The university has an extensive range of state-of-the-art fully equipped laboratory facilities and technical resources at its disposal including computer networks labs, power/industrial electronics lab, communications lab, electrical machines/EMI lab, DCL/embedded system labs, instrumentation & testing center, engineering mechanics lab, engineering drawing lab, engineering mechanics lab, survey lab, sewing lab, draping lab, drawing lab, computer lab, textile printing lab, weaving lab and control lab. These facilities are fully supported and continually reviewed by a team of highly qualified technical staff to ensure that they meet the highest international standards and undergo regular refurbishment and equipment replacement.

The facilities available are second to none and supplement lectures by extensive practical work.

Study visits 

Visits to industrial sites and organizations are arranged so that students can gather practical knowledge about national and multinational organizations and industries. This helps them to get better jobs.

Recreational programs 

Along with academic activities, cultural, recreational and instructive programs are arranged for students. These include cultural programs, picnics, study tours, debate and indoor & outdoor games.

Library 

The campus maintains about 6,000 relevant books pertaining to Electrical/Electronics Engineering, Computer Sciences, Finance, Human Resource, Marketing, Accounting, Economics, Quantitative Techniques, Research Methodologies, Business Communication etc.

The Information Resource Center (IRC) offers more than a traditional library. Information resources accessible through the IRC include books, journals, magazines, newspapers, audio and video titles, and software digital libraries on local CD servers. Fully computerized, the IRC has more than 6,000 books on its shelves covering a wide variety of subjects and subscribes to 60 national and international journals/periodicals.

Other salient features of the IRC are article indexing, newspaper clippings, text database for selected newspaper articles and latest retrieval techniques to search for a particular book/subject or article from the IRC database. Internet and web facilities to search for any required material from other national and international data warehouses are available.

Fields in which books are available:

Transport 

INU owns a fleet of transport including three buses, two coasters, one van and five cars to meet the conveyance facilities of the students, teaching faculty and administrative staff.

Auditorium 

In the basement, the INU auditorium is a multi-use auditorium that seats 450 people. It features wonderful acoustics and a warm and welcoming ambiance. It is a perfect venue for seminars, homecoming/welcome parties, fashion shows as well as lectures, conferences, and graduations. The auditorium is equipped with sophisticated sound and lighting facilities as well as collapsible walls to suit different functions.

Sports facilities

Swimming pool 

An indoor, all season, standard swimming pool will be operational, starting summers 2013 at INU. The swimming pool would cater to students currently studying at campus.

Tennis court 
Following standard tennis court dimensions, INU has two tennis courts for the leisure of students. The courts are packed in the evenings with players. The courts can occupy players for single and doubles.

Table tennis 
Table tennis stands as a favorite sport for many. INU has indoor table tennis courts where students drop by for a game.

Cricket 
INU has a very active cricket team. From pavilion to ground, they mark as one of the outstanding teams of Peshawar. Run under the sport society, the cricket team has brought multiple laurels to INU by participating on the provincial and national level. Starting this year, a yearly T-20 cup is arranged by INU's sport society that harnesses their potential and further polishes their skills.

Societies 
INU has several active societies.
 INU Sports Society
 INU Music Society
 INU Debate Society
 INU Dramatic Society
 TEDxINU
 ASCE (American Society of CIVIL Engineers)
 IYDC (Iqra Youth Development Conference)
 Khana-e-Fun (art & sesign)

Universities and colleges in Peshawar
2000 establishments in Pakistan
Educational institutions established in 2000
Private universities and colleges in Khyber Pakhtunkhwa
Peshawar District